Our Lady of Grace Church, or variations including Our Lady of Grace Catholic Church and Church of Our Lady of Grace, may refer to:

India
Our Lady of Grace Church (Chorão Island)

Malta
Our Lady of Graces Chapel, Qrendi
Parish Church of Our Lady of Graces, Żabbar

United States
Our Lady of Grace Church (Stratford, Connecticut)
Our Lady of Grace Church (Reserve, Louisiana), listed on the National Register of Historic Places in St. John the Baptist Parish, Louisiana
Church of Our Lady of Grace (Hoboken, New Jersey), listed on the National Register of Historic Places
Our Lady of Grace Catholic Church (Greensboro, North Carolina)

See also
Our Lady of Grace (disambiguation)